Arnaud Dubois (born 2 May 1986 in Verviers, Belgium) is a Belgian racing cyclist who represents Belgium in BMX. He represented Belgium at the 2012 Summer Olympics in the men's BMX event.

References

External links
 
 
 

1986 births
Living people
BMX riders
Belgian male cyclists
Olympic cyclists of Belgium
Cyclists at the 2012 Summer Olympics
People from Verviers
Cyclists from Liège Province